Frank Schulze (born 31 March 1970) is a German former footballer who played as a goalkeeper.

Career

Schulze played as a youth for his hometown club, Stahl Riesa, before joining Dynamo Dresden at age 11. He eventually made it through to the first-team, and made three league appearances in the 1989–90 season as third choice 'keeper (behind Thomas Köhler and Ronny Teuber) as Dynamo won the DDR-Oberliga. He also played in the East German Cup final, a 3–0 win over Dynamo Schwerin which completed the double for Dresden.

Schulze spent the 1990–91 season on loan at Viktoria Frankfurt (Oder), and made 20 appearances as the side finished bottom of the NOFV-Oberliga. The league, which had been renamed after German reunification, was used to decide how East German teams would be placed in the unified league system, and Frankfurt's position saw them remain in the NOFV-Oberliga, which would now be at the third tier. Schulze returned to Dynamo Dresden, who had qualified for the Bundesliga, where he spent three years without making an appearance, before retiring in 1994.

Internationally, Schulze played for East Germany at youth level, and was considered for the Olympic team's qualification campaign for the 1992 tournament, before reunification brought an end to it. Following this, he won one cap for the Germany under-21 team in 1990.

External links
Career stats at RSSSF

1970 births
Living people
German footballers
East German footballers
Germany under-21 international footballers
Association football goalkeepers
Dynamo Dresden players
Dynamo Dresden II players
1. FC Frankfurt players